The 1969 UC Santa Barbara Gauchos football team represented University of California, Santa Barbara (UCSB) during the 1969 NCAA University Division football season.

This was UCSB's first year in the University Division and was the inaugural season for the Pacific Coast Athletic Association. The team was led by seventh-year head coach Jack Curtice, and played home games at Campus Stadium in Santa Barbara, California. They finished the season with a record of six wins and four losses (6–4, 1–3 PCAA).

Schedule

Notes

References

UC Santa Barbara
UC Santa Barbara Gauchos football seasons
UC Santa Barbara Gauchos football